Shima Park is a public urban park in Loudi, Hunan, China. Located in Louxing District, Shima Park is bordered by Xiangyin West Street on the South, Xiushi Street on the West, Yuetang Street on the North, and Xinxing Middle Road on the East. It is a renowned botanical garden and scenic spot integrating scientific research & popularization and tourism in Hunan. It is adjacent to the Loudi railway station.

Tourist attractions
 Yuma Lake
 Shima Pavilion
 Relief Wall

Natural history
There are more than 20 plant species cultivated in this park, including Cinnamomum camphora, Cupressus lusitanica, Magnolia grandiflora, willow, Magnolia denudata, Osmanthus fragrans, Metasequoia glyptostroboides, peach, Acer rubrum, Pinus massoniana, Rhododendron simsii, and Phyllostachys edulis.

Public access
In 1999, Shima Park was officially opened to the public.

Gallery

References

Parks in Hunan
Louxing District
Tourist attractions in Loudi
1999 establishments in China